is a 2017 Japanese film directed by , written by Mari Okada and starring Fumika Shimizu, Marie Iitoyo, Nana Seino, Tina Tamashiro, Riria, Yuna Taira, Takeshi Masu and Yudai Chiba. It was released in Japan by Toei and Showgate on 1 April 2017. Fumika Shimizu, one of the film's stars, joined the new religious movement Happy Science after filming and did not participate in promotional activities for the film's release.

Cast
Fumika Shimizu as Sayuri Sumikawa
Marie Iitoyo as Itsumi Shiraishi
Nana Seino as Shiyo Takaoka
Tina Tamashiro as Diana Decheva
Riria as Akane Kominami
Yuna Taira as Mirei Nitani
Takeshi Masu as Itsumi's father
Yudai Chiba as Teacher Hojo

References

External links
 

Films based on Japanese novels
Films based on mystery novels
Toei Company films
Showgate films
Films with screenplays by Mari Okada
2017 films
2010s Japanese films

ja:暗黒女子#映画